This is a list of all described Ediacaran genera, including the Ediacaran biota. It contains 227 genera.

References 

Ediacaran